Einar Ortiz (born 22 May 1993) is a Cuban-Italian singer.

He ended up third in the seventeenth edition of the Italian talent show Amici di Maria De Filippi and released his debut EP Einar on 1 June 2018.

Einar participated at the Sanremo Music Festival 2019 with the song "Parole nuove".

Discography

Studio albums 
 Parole nuove (2019)
 Istinto (2022)

Extended plays 
 Einar (2018)

Singles 
 "Chi ama non dimentica" (2018)
 "Salutalo da parte mia" (2018)
 "Notte d'agosto" (2018)
 "Centomila volte" (2018)
 "Parole nuove" (2019)
 "Un'altra volta te" (2019)
 "Caligine" (2021)

References

Italian pop singers
Living people
21st-century Italian male  singers
1993 births